The 2000 Catalan motorcycle Grand Prix was the seventh round of the 2000 Grand Prix motorcycle racing season. It took place on 11 June 2000 at the Circuit de Catalunya.  This was the 600th race to contribute to the Grand Prix motorcycle racing championship.

500 cc classification

250 cc classification

125 cc classification

Championship standings after the race (500cc)

Below are the standings for the top five riders and constructors after round seven has concluded. 

Riders' Championship standings

Constructors' Championship standings

 Note: Only the top five positions are included for both sets of standings.

References

Catalan motorcycle Grand Prix
Catalan
Catalan Motorcycle Grand Prix
motorcycle